Elisabeth Axmann (Siret, 19 June 1926 – Cologne, 21 April 2015) was a Romanian writer, art and literature critic. She spent her childhood in Bukovina, Moldavia and Transylvania. Axmann moved to Germany in 1977.

Selected works
 Spiegelufer. Gedichte 1968-2004. Aachen: Rimbaud Verlag, 2004 (2nd Ed. 2017).  
 Wege, Städte. Erinnerungen. Aachen: Rimbaud Verlag, 2005. 
 Fünf Dichter aus der Bukowina (Alfred Margul-Sperber, Rose Ausländer, Moses Rosenkranz, Alfred Kittner, Paul Celan). Aachen: Rimbaud Verlag, 2007. .
 Die Kunststrickerin. Erinnerungssplitter. Aachen: Rimbaud Verlag, 2010. 
 Glykon. Gedichte. Aachen: Rimbaud Verlag, 2012.

References

External links
 Biography at Rimbaud (Publishers)
 

1926 births
2015 deaths
People from Siret
Romanian writers
German women writers
Romanian emigrants to Germany